Černá Hora (i.e. black mountain in Czech) may refer to:

Černá Hora (Blansko District), a market town in the Czech Republic
Černá hora (Bohemian Forest), a peak in the Bohemian Forest
 Černá hora, a peak in the Giant Mountains
Montenegro, a country called Černá Hora in Czech

See also
Montenegro (disambiguation)
Black Mountain (disambiguation)